The Spirits of Love, also known as Love,  is a Taiwanese Hokkien television drama that aired on Formosa Television in Taiwan from 21 November 2006 to 31 May 2010. It stars Chen Meifeng, Wang Shih-hsien, Fon Cin & Chiang Tsu-ping.  The show has five theme songs including Wu Bai & China Blue's 1995 hit "Love You Ten Thousand Years" (愛你一萬年). It aired in Taiwan every weeknight at prime time (20:00) and had a total of 386 episodes.

Cast

Luos

Lins

Wangs

For Wang Wenqiang, see the Zhangs

Mas

Zhangs

Songs

Lius

Yangs

Masha's family (United Hotel)

Lis

Hong Shuibo's family

Guos

Hongs (World Hotel)

Wus (Former County Council Speaker's family)

Lais

Xies

Tangs

Tang Zhen's family

Dings

Soundtrack

Theme song

Sub theme songs

International broadcast

Singapore broadcast
The show was originally broadcast on November 9, 2008, on Channel 8, with the show having a timeslot of 7pm on the weekends, with it being dubbed in Mandarin Chinese, as it is prohibited in Singapore to broadcast in Chinese dialects. After the weekday 7pm drama Your Hand In Mine concluded its broadcast on July 16, 2010, Love's timeslot was extended to the weekdays, making it a daily series. The timeslot was pushed back to only weekdays after Night Market Life started broadcasting on February 27, 2011. Love concluded its run on Channel 8 on October 21, 2011, and was replaced with Kampong Ties.

Repeat Telecast (2012)
It repeated its run from Monday - Thursday from 10.30 am to 12.30pm (two episodes per day), starting on November 8, 2012, and ended its repeat telecast on  September 30, 2014.

Vietnam broadcast
The show was first broadcast in Vietnamese on Vinh Long Province’s Radio and Television Station, channel 1 (THVL1). The show was broadcast every weekday at the 5 pm time slot, running from October 23, 2010, to September 23, 2012.

Malaysia broadcast
The drama was broadcast on Astro Hua Hee Dai in the show's original Hokkien language on Weekdays 4:30pm to 5:30pm.

References

External links
Program webpage at Formosa Television website 
Program cast and synopsis at Mediacorp xinmsn website 

2004 Taiwanese television series debuts
2006 Taiwanese television series endings
Formosa Television original programming
Taiwanese drama television series
Television shows set in Taiwan
Hokkien-language television shows